Jure Dobelšek (born 1 April 1984 in Celje, Yugoslavia) is a Slovenian professional handball player currently playing for RK Cimos Koper.

Information

Height:  
Weight:  
Position: left wing

Career

Clubs: Gorenje Velenje, Cimos Koper

Career: 1994

References

Living people
1985 births
Slovenian male handball players
Sportspeople from Celje